Ariopsis is a genus of sea catfishes found along the Pacific and Atlantic coasts of the Americas. The genus has been merged with Sciades by some authorities.

Species
There are currently four described species in this genus:
 Ariopsis assimilis (Günther, 1864) (Mayan sea catfish)
 Ariopsis felis (Linnaeus, 1766) (Hardhead sea catfish)
 Ariopsis guatemalensis (Günther, 1864) (Blue sea catfish)
 Ariopsis seemanni (Günther, 1864) (Tete sea catfish)

References

Ariidae
Catfish genera
Taxa named by Theodore Gill
Marine fish genera